Lyudmila Yevgenyevna Titova (born 26 March 1946) is a retired Russian speed skater.

Short biography

After winning three national titles in 1966, she made her international debut at the World Allround Speed Skating Championships of 1966. She finished 18th overall, not having qualified for the final distance, but was second in the 500 m event. Next year, she did not compete much because of exams at the Moscow Aviation Institute where she studied.

In 1968, Titova became Soviet allround champion and two weeks later participated in the world all-round championships again, winning both the 500 m and the 1,000 m, while finishing sixth overall. Two weeks after that, at the 1968 Winter Olympics in Grenoble, she became Olympic Champion on the 500 m and won silver on the 1,000 m, finishing 0.3 seconds behind Dutch skater Carry Geijssen who skated a new Olympic record.

Titova became the 1970 World Sprint Champion (the first time they were held and named ISU Sprint Championships then) and although she loved the sprint distances and found the 3,000 m boring, it did not prevent her from competing in allround events, and she even won silver at the European Allround Championships in 1971 and bronze at the World Allround Championships that same year.

At the 1972 Winter Olympics in Sapporo, Titova won bronze on the 500 m and finished fourth on the 1,000 m, 0.23 seconds too slow for bronze. Later that same year, she won bronze at the World Sprint Championships and became Soviet Sprint Champion. She then semi-retired until the 1975 World Sprint Championships, where she was disqualified. Next year, she participated in the 1,000 m at the 1976 Winter Olympics, finishing seventh. Titova's last time in a competition was two months later, when she won bronze at the Soviet Sprint Championships.

After retiring from competitions she worked as a TV speed skating commentator and later as director of public relations at association Sport Park. Together with two other female graduates from the Moscow Aviation Institute, Titova – almost 50 years old then – was part of a skiing expedition team that reached the Geographic South Pole on 11 January 1996.

Medals
An overview of medals won by Titova at important championships she participated in, listing the years in which she won each:

World records
Over the course of her career, Titova skated 3 world records:

Personal records

References

External links
Lyudmila Titova at SkateResults.com
Short biography of Lyudmila Titova (in Russian)
Lyudmila Titova at the South Pole (in Russian)

1946 births
Living people
Moscow Aviation Institute alumni
Soviet female speed skaters
Burevestnik (sports society) athletes
Olympic speed skaters of the Soviet Union
Olympic gold medalists for the Soviet Union
Olympic silver medalists for the Soviet Union
Olympic bronze medalists for the Soviet Union
Speed skaters at the 1968 Winter Olympics
Speed skaters at the 1972 Winter Olympics
Speed skaters at the 1976 Winter Olympics
Olympic medalists in speed skating
World record setters in speed skating
Russian female speed skaters
Medalists at the 1972 Winter Olympics
Medalists at the 1968 Winter Olympics
Universiade medalists in speed skating
World Allround Speed Skating Championships medalists
Universiade gold medalists for the Soviet Union
Competitors at the 1970 Winter Universiade
People from Chita, Zabaykalsky Krai
Sportspeople from Zabaykalsky Krai